Gertze is a surname. Notable people with the surname include:

Johanna Gertze (1836–1935), Namibian Herero and Christian convert
Kalla Gertze (1960–2008), Namibian university lecturer and parliamentarian
Neville Gertze (born 1966), Namibian diplomat
Odile Gertze (born c. 1988), Namibian beauty queen

See also 
Gertz